Sibulan, officially the Municipality of Sibulan,  is a second class municipality in the province of Negros Oriental, Philippines. According to the 2020 census, it has a population of 64,343 people.

It is the location of Dumaguete Airport, the main airport for Negros Oriental.

Sibulan is also the location of the Balinsasayao Twin Lakes Natural Park, composed of Lake Balinsasayao and Lake Danao.

Geography

Barangays
Sibulan is politically subdivided into 15 barangays.

Sibulan has six coastal barangays: from north to south they are Ajong, Looc, Poblacion, Cangmating, Maslog, Agan-an and Boloc-boloc. The provincial airport, known as the Dumaguete Airport, is actually in Agan-an, Sibulan. There is a growing number of guest houses and beach resorts from Cangmating southward to Dumaguete and the coral reefs of Ajong are attracting more dive boats.

The municipal seat is in barangay Poblacion, approximately midway along the coast of the town. The main municipal port facility is in Poblacion, where a ferry runs every hour to Brgy. Liloan, Santander on the tip of Cebu island. There is also a fishing and freight port in barangay Looc.

Sibulan has two small Marine Protected Areas (MPAs), which are coral reef areas that prohibit fishing, swimming and diving. One is in Agan-an, just north of the airport, the other in Cangmating. These were established to improve the sustainability of the local fishery.

The inland barangays are primarily agricultural and residential with minimal business and public facilities.  Most commercial development is along the national highway, which runs the length of the town from Dumaguete in the south to San Jose at the north.  Most business and light industry is along the highway in Boloc-Boloc, Maslog, Agan-an and Poblacion including newly opened 100-bed Negros Polymedic Hospital.  This is largely urban sprawl from Dumaguete seeking the advantageous tax rates in Sibulan.

Sibulan also boasts a golf course resort, perched on the foothills in barangay San Antonio, just north of the town center.

Climate

Demographics

Economy

Education

Colleges

Public High Schools

Elementary Schools

 Agan-an Elementary School
 Bagtic Public School (Tubod)
 Balugo Elementary School
 Bolocboloc Elementary School
 Calabnugan Elementary School
 Calinawan Elementary School
 Cambajao Elementary School
 Cangmating Elementary School
 Cantalawan Elementary School
 Escaguit Elementary School
 Libertad Ong Calderon Memorial ES (Ajong Elementary School)
 Lo-oc Elementary School
 Magatas Elementary School
 Magsaysay Memorial Elementary School
 Maningcao Elementary School
 Maslog Elementary School
 San Antonio Elementary School
 Sibulan Central Elementary School
 Tubigon Elementary School
 Tubtubon Elementary School

Gallery

References

External links

 The travel guide Wikivoyage includes Sibulan in its Dumaguete article.
 [ Philippine Standard Geographic Code]
Philippine Census Information
Local Governance Performance Management System

Municipalities of Negros Oriental
Port cities and towns in the Philippines